European route E 691 is a European B class road running from Armenia through Georgia to Turkey.

Route 
 
: Ashtarak - Gyumri - Ashotsk
 
:  Ninotsminda - Akhalkalaki -  Akhaltsikhe
: Akhaltsikhe - Vale 
 
: Türkgözü - Çamlıçatak
: Çamlıçatak - Kars
: Kars - Karakurt
: Karakurt - Horasan

External links 
 UN Economic Commission for Europe: Overall Map of E-road Network (2007)

International E-road network
E691
Georgia
Roads in Turkey